Nagpur LGBT Queer Carnival is an annual event organised by Orange Tales, a start up event organisation, as a part of Pride Month celebrations in Nagpur, Maharashtra. The purpose of the event is to spread awareness about the community around the city. The event involves dance performances, story telling, and poetry reading events. This event has been held annually since 2018

References 

LGBT festivals in India
Nagpur